Son contento (I'm Happy) is a 1983 Italian drama comedy film directed by Maurizio Ponzi.

For his performance Carlo Giuffré won the David di Donatello for best supporting actor.

Cast 
Francesco Nuti: Francesco 
Barbara De Rossi: Paola
Carlo Giuffré: Falcone
Novello Novelli: Manager
Ricky Tognazzi: Postman

References

External links

1983 films
Italian comedy-drama films
Films directed by Maurizio Ponzi
Films scored by Carlo Maria Cordio
1983 comedy-drama films
1983 comedy films
1983 drama films
1980s Italian films